Amrita Pritam (31 August 1919 – 31 October 2005) was an Indian novelist, essayist and poet, who wrote in Punjabi and Hindi. A prominent figure in Punjabi literature, she is the recipient of the 1956 Sahitya Akademi Award. Her body of work comprised over 100 books of poetry, fiction, biographies, essays, a collection of Punjabi folk songs and an autobiography that were all translated into several Indian and foreign languages.

Pritam is best remembered for her poignant poem, Ajj aakhaan Waris Shah nu (Today I invoke Waris Shah – "Ode to Waris Shah"), an elegy to the 18th-century Punjabi poet, an expression of her anguish over massacres during the partition of India. As a novelist, her most noted work was Pinjar ("The Skeleton", 1950), in which she created her memorable character, Puro, an epitome of violence against women, loss of humanity and ultimate surrender to existential fate; the novel was made into an award-winning film, Pinjar (2003).

When India was partitioned into the independent states of India and Pakistan in 1947, she migrated from Lahore, to India, though she remained equally popular in Pakistan throughout her life, as compared to her contemporaries like Mohan Singh and Shiv Kumar Batalvi.

Pritam's magnum opus, a long poem, Sunehade won her the 1956 Sahitya Akademi Award, making her the first and the only woman to have been given the award for a work in Punjabi. She later received the Bharatiya Jnanpith, one of India's highest literary awards, in 1982 for Kagaz Te Canvas ("The Paper and the Canvas"). The Padma Shri came her way in 1969 and finally, Padma Vibhushan, India's second highest civilian award, in 2004, and in the same year she was honoured with India's highest literary award, given by the Sahitya Akademi (India's Academy of Letters), the Sahitya Akademi Fellowship given to the "immortals of literature" for lifetime achievement. she wrote her poems mostly for the partition

Biography

Background
Amrita Pritam was born as Amrit Kaur in 1919 in Gujranwala, Punjab, in British India, the only child of Raj Bibi, who was a school teacher, and Kartar Singh Hitkari, who was a poet, a scholar of the Braj Bhasha language, and the editor of a literary journal. Besides this, he was a pracharak – a preacher of the Sikh faith. Amrita's mother died when she was eleven. Soon after, she and her father moved to Lahore, where she lived till her migration to India in 1947. Confronting adult responsibilities and besieged by loneliness following her mother's death, she began to write at an early age. Her first anthology of poems, Amrit Lehran ("Immortal Waves") was published in 1936, at age sixteen, the year she married Pritam Singh, an editor to whom she was engaged in early childhood, and changed her name from Amrit Kaur to Amrita Pritam. Half a dozen collections of poems followed between 1936 and 1943.

Though she began her journey as a romantic poet, soon she shifted gears, and became part of the Progressive Writers' Movement and its effect was seen in her collection, Lok Peed ("People's Anguish", 1944), which openly criticised the war-torn economy, after the Bengal famine of 1943. She was also involved in social work to a certain extent and participated in such activities wholeheartedly, after Independence when social activist Guru Radha Kishan took the initiative to bring the first Janta Library in Delhi, which was inaugurated by Balraj Sahni and Aruna Asaf Ali and contributed to the occasion accordingly. This study centre cum library is still running at Clock Tower, Delhi. She also worked at a radio station in Lahore for a while, before the partition of India.

M. S. Sathyu, the director of the partition movie Garam Hava (1973), paid a theatrical tribute to her through his performance 'Ek Thee Amrita'.

Partition of India
One million people, Hindus, Sikhs  and Muslims died from communal violence that followed the partition of India in 1947, and left Amrita Pritam a Punjabi refugee at age 28, when she left Lahore and moved to New Delhi. Subsequently, in 1947, while she was pregnant with her son, and traveling from Dehradun to Delhi, she expressed anguish on a piece of paper like the poem, "Ajj Aakhaan Waris Shah Nu" (I ask Waris Shah Today); this poem was to later immortalize her and become the most poignant reminder of the horrors of Partition. The poem addressed to the Sufi poet Waris Shah, author of the tragic saga of Heer and Ranjah and with whom she shares her birthplace.

Amrita Pritam worked until 1961 in the Punjabi service of All India Radio, Delhi. After her divorce in 1960, her work became more feminist. Many of her stories and poems drew on the unhappy experience of her marriage. A number of her works have been translated into English, French, Danish, Japanese, Mandarin, and other languages from Punjabi and Urdu, including her autobiographical works Black Rose and Rasidi Ticket (Revenue Stamp).

The first of Amrita Pritam's books to be filmed was Dharti Sagar te Sippiyan, as Kadambari (1965), followed by Unah Di Kahani, as Daaku (Dacoit, 1976), directed by Basu Bhattacharya. Her novel Pinjar (The Skeleton, 1950) narrates the story of partition riots along with the crisis of women who suffered during the times. It was made into an award-winning Hindi movie by Chandra Prakash Dwivedi, because of its humanism: "Amritaji has portrayed the suffering of people of both the countries." Pinjar was shot in a border region of Rajasthan and Punjab.

She edited Nagmani, a monthly literary magazine in Punjabi for several years, which she ran together with Imroz, for 33 years; though after Partition she wrote prolifically in Hindi as well. Later in life, she turned to Osho and wrote introductions for several books of Osho, including Ek Onkar Satnam, and also started writing on spiritual themes and dreams, producing works like Kaal Chetna ("Time Consciousness") and Agyat Ka Nimantran ("Call of the Unknown"). She had also published autobiographies, titled, Kala Gulab ("Black Rose", 1968), Rasidi Ticket ("The Revenue Stamp", 1976), and Aksharon kay Saayee ("Shadows of Words").

Awards and honors
Amrita was the first recipient of Punjab Rattan Award conferred upon her by Punjab Chief Minister Capt. Amarinder Singh. She was the first female recipient of the Sahitya Akademi Award in 1956 for Sunehadey (poetic diminutive of the Punjabi word "ਸੁਨੇਹੇ" (Sunehe), Messages), Amrita Pritam received the Bhartiya Jnanpith Award, India's highest literary award, in 1982 for Kagaj te Canvas (Paper and Canvas). She received the Padma Shri (1969) and Padma Vibhushan, India's second highest civilian award, and Sahitya Akademi Fellowship, India's highest literary award, also in 2004. She received D.Litt. honorary degrees, from many universities including, Delhi University (1973), Jabalpur University (1973) and Vishwa Bharati (1987).

She also received the international Vaptsarov Award from the Republic of Bulgaria (1979) and Degree of Officer dens, Ordre des Arts et des Lettres (Officier) by the French Government (1987). She was nominated as a member of Rajya Sabha 1986–92. Towards the end of her life, she was awarded by Pakistan's Punjabi Academy, to which she had remarked, Bade dino baad mere Maike ko meri Yaad aayi.. (My motherland has remembered me after a long time); and also Punjabi poets of Pakistan, sent her a chaddar, from the tombs of Waris Shah, and fellow Sufi mystic poets Bulle Shah and Sultan Bahu.

Personal life

In 1935, Amrita married Pritam Singh, son of a hosiery merchant of Lahore's Anarkali bazaar. They had two children together, a son and a daughter. In 1960, Amrita Pritam left her husband. She is also said to have had an unrequited affection for poet Sahir Ludhianvi. The story of this love is depicted in her autobiography, Rasidi Ticket (Revenue Stamp). When another woman, singer Sudha Malhotra came into Sahir's life, Amrita found solace in the companionship of the artist and writer Inderjeet Imroz. She spent the last forty years of her life with Imroz, who also designed most of her book covers and made her the subject of his several paintings. Their life together is also the subject of a book, Amrita Imroz: A Love Story.

She died in her sleep on 31 October 2005 at the age of 86 in New Delhi, after a long illness. She was survived by her partner Imroz, daughter Kandlla, son Navraj Kwatra, daughter-in-law Alka, and her grandchildren, Kartik, Noor, Aman and Shilpi. Navraj Kwatra was found murdered in his Borivali apartment in 2012. Three men were accused of the murder but were acquitted due to lack of evidence.

Legacy
In 2007, an audio album titled, 'Amrita recited by Gulzar' was released by noted lyricist Gulzar, with poems of Amrita Pritam recited by him. A film on her life is also in production.
On 31 August 2019, Google honoured her by commemorating her 100th birth anniversary with a Doodle. The accompanying write up read as, "Today’s Doodle celebrates Amrita Pritam, one of history’s foremost female Punjabi writers, who 'dared to live the life she imagines.' Born in Gujranwala, British India, 100 years ago today, Pritam published her first collection of verse at the age of 16."

Bibliography

Novels
 Pinjar
 Doctor Dev
 Kore Kagaz, Unchas Din
 Dharti, Sagar aur Seepian
 Rang ka Patta
 Dilli ki Galiyan
 Terahwan Suraj
 Yaatri
 Jilavatan (1968)
 Hardatt Ka Zindaginama 

Autobiographies
 Black Rose (1968)
 Rasidi Ticket (1976)
 Shadows of Words (2004)
Short stories
 Kahaniyan jo Kahaniyan Nahi
 Kahaniyon ke Angan mein
 Stench of Kerosene

Poetry anthologies
 Amrit Lehran (Immortal Waves)(1936)
 Jiunda Jiwan (The Exuberant Life) (1939)
 Trel Dhote Phul (1942)
 O Gitan Valia (1942)
 Badlam De Laali (1943)
 Sanjh de laali (1943)
 Lok Peera (The People's Anguish) (1944)
 Pathar Geetey (The Pebbles) (1946)
 Punjab Di Aawaaz (1952)
 Sunehade (Messages) (1955) – Sahitya Akademi Award
 Ashoka Cheti (1957)
 Kasturi (1957)
 Nagmani (1964)
 Ik Si Anita (1964)
 Chak Nambar Chatti (1964)
 Uninja Din (49 Days) (1979)
 Kagaz Te Kanvas (1981)- Bhartiya Jnanpith
 Chuni Huyee Kavitayen
 Ek Baat

Literary journals
 Nagmani, poetry monthly

See also
 Indian Writers
 Indian Poets

References

Further reading
 Amrita Pritam Di Kav-Kala (Punjabi- Sikh Publishing House Ltd.; pages 258; Pub: October 1954)
Amrita Work in Shahmukhi NAVEEN RUTIndex ACADEMY OF PUNJAB IN NORTH AMERICA
 Uma Trilok, Amrita Imroz: A Love Story, Penguin India (2006) 
 Indra Gupta, India’s 50 Most Illustrious Women 
 Indian Fiction in English Translation – Chapt 4: Comments on Amrita Pritam's Magnum Opus: The Skeleton (Jagdev Singh), by Shubha Tiwari. Atlantic Publishers & Distributors, 2005. . Page 28-35
 Studies in Punjabi Poetry. Chapt. 9- Amrita Pritam: The Poetry of Protest, by Darshan Singh Maini. Vikas Pub., 1979. . Page 109.
 1st chapter of Revenue Stamp by Amrita Pritam
 "The Cellar" by Amrita Pritam
 “Sahiban in Exile” by Amrita Pritam
 "The Weed" by Amrita Pritam
 "Wild Flower" by Amrita Pritam
  Main Tenu Phir Milangi, (I will meet you yet again) Translation

External links

Amrita Pritam at Gadya Kosh (her prose work in Devanagari script)
Amrita Pritam and her Works at South Asian Women's Network (Sawnet)
Amrita Pritam 1919-2005-a tribute by Raza Rumi
Amrita Pritam talking about Partition and violence against women
Poems by Amrita Pritam at Kavitayan (Archived 2009-10-25)
Amrita Pritam | Kavishala Sootradhar
Video links

1919 births
2005 deaths
Indian feminist writers
Indian women novelists
Indian women poets
Indian autobiographers
Indian women non-fiction writers
Poets from Lahore
Recipients of the Sahitya Akademi Award in Punjabi
Recipients of the Jnanpith Award
Recipients of the Padma Shri in literature & education
Recipients of the Padma Vibhushan in literature & education
Recipients of the Sahitya Akademi Fellowship
Indian Sikhs
Indian feminists
Punjabi-language poets
Punjabi-language writers
Punjabi people
Hindi-language writers
Nominated members of the Rajya Sabha
Writers from Delhi
Indian magazine editors
Officiers of the Ordre des Arts et des Lettres
Sikh feminists
Sikh writers
Women autobiographers
People from Gujranwala
20th-century Indian poets
20th-century Indian novelists
20th-century Indian women writers
20th-century Indian essayists
Indian women essayists
Women writers from Delhi
Rajneesh movement
Women magazine editors
Women members of the Rajya Sabha
Indian women